</noinclude>

A former Serb artillery outpost and 79 parcels of private land, the area was taken over by U.S. Marines and used as a base of operation during the Kosovo War of 1999. The camp was named after Jimmie W. Monteith, who received the Medal of Honor for heroism in France during World War II. At its peak, the camp housed 2000 soldiers and civilian contractors. Established in June 1999 to be used as a staging point for the bulk of US forces stationed in the Multi National Brigade-East. Initially occupied by U.S. Marines, over the past seven years successive rotations of U.S. Army forces have used the camp as part of NATO’s KFOR.

The base camp originally consisted of one main building, used as a command post and makeshift interrogation center, as well as a few small outbuildings that had been stripped by retreating Serb forces. The other buildings were destroyed previously by bombing during Operation Allied Force.

Initially the United States Marine Corps occupied the land during Operation Joint Guardian setting up camp around the main building in tents and in their vehicles, and patrolling Gjilan and the surrounding villages. In July 1999, U.S. Navy Seabees, along with Kellogg Brown & Root (KBR), began construction of more permanent structures, with plumbing and electricity including a vast number of semi-permanent barracks known as South East Asia huts (SEAhuts). The camp continued to be used by peacekeeping forces up until early 2006 when the remaining soldiers relocated to Camp Bondsteel. The camp was closed in March 2007 to U.S. personnel and as of July 2007 has been transferred to the Kosovo Security Force.

Notes

External links
 Globalsecurity.org profile
UNMIK press briefing noting plans for base closure

1999 establishments in Kosovo
2007 disestablishments in Europe
Military installations closed in 2007
Military installations established in 1999
Military installations of the United States in Kosovo
Military installations of Kosovo
United States Marine Corps in the 20th century